Estey Organ Company was an organ manufacturer based in Brattleboro, Vermont.  The company was founded in 1852 by Jacob Estey, who bought out another Brattleboro manufacturing business.  At its peak, the company was one of the world's largest organ manufacturers, employed about 700 people, and sold its high-quality items as far away as Africa, Great Britain, Australia, and New Zealand. Estey built around 500,000 to 520,000 pump organs between 1846 and 1955. Estey also produced pianos, made at the Estey Piano Company Factory in New York City.

History

Jacob Estey

Jacob Estey (1814–1890) born in Hinsdale, New Hampshire, ran away from an orphanage to Worcester, Massachusetts, where he learned the plumbing trade. In 1835 he arrived in Brattleboro, Vermont at age 21 to work in a plumbing shop. He soon bought the shop, beginning a long career as a successful businessman. He died in 1890.

About 1850, Estey built a two-story shop in Brattleboro and rented it out to a small company that manufactured melodeons. When the renters ran short of cash, Estey took an interest in the business in lieu of rent, eventually becoming sole proprietor. Despite having no musical talent or skills as an inventor, Jacob Estey grew the company into a great success, giving up the plumbing business. In 1855, Estey organized the first manufacturing company to bear his name, Estey & Greene—followed by Estey & Company, J. Estey & Company, Estey Organ Company—and finally, Estey Organ Corporation. In advertising copy the company claimed to have been building organs since 1846.

Jacob Estey saw the manufacturing and sale of these instruments, later known as American reed organs, as a new business opportunity.

Estey reed organs in the 19th century

Estey-Welte, an unrelated competitor

In 1926 another company used the name Estey. It was the Estey-Welte Corporation, and began when George Gittins, owner of the entirely separate Estey Piano Company (The Bronx, NY), acquired the American assets of the Welte Company seized during World War I. That year, Estey-Welte acquired the Hall Organ Company of West Philadelphia and a new built six-floor building at 695 Fifth Avenue as showrooms and salesrooms. This became the company's home, and the offices of the Welte Mignon Studios and the other subsidiary companies—including the Estey Piano Company, the Welte Mignon Corporation, the Welte Organ Company, the North American Discount Company, the Estey-Welte Securities Company, and the Eswell Realty Corporation. In 1926 Estey-Welte formed The Welte-Mignon Studios of Florida, Inc. in Palm Beach. 
The Estey-Welte company was forced into receivership in 1927 after a flurry of unabashed stock manipulations stemming from the Philadelphia brokerage house of Frank C. McCown, eventually being revived as the Welte-Tripp Organ Co. of Sound Beach, CT.

Estey in the early 20th century 

Over its more than one hundred years, the Vermont Estey company became the largest and best known manufacturer of reed organs in the world. It made more than 520,000 instruments, all labeled Brattleboro, Vt. USA.  In 1901, Estey Organ Company began making pipe organs, and became one of the largest American pipe organ manufacturers. They built and sold more than 3,200 pipe organs across the U.S. and abroad. The company provided organs for many important locations, including New York City's Capital Theatre, the Sacramento, CA Municipal Auditorium, and Henry Ford's home in Dearborn, Michigan.

Also during the era of silent films, Estey made over 160 theatre organs.

Estey Organ after World War II
Following World War II, Estey developed and manufactured electronic organs, joining a limited number of companies that manufactured all three types of organs—reed, pipe, and electronic. In the 1950s, Harald Bode joined Estey. He had  been a pioneer in the research and development of electronic musical instrument since the 1930s, and had developed the Bode Organ in 1951. At Estey, he helped develop the Estey Electronic Organ model S and AS-1 (1954), then served as a chief engineer and a vice-president of Estey during the late 1950s.

Later history

Fletcher Music Centers purchased the Estey Organ company name in 1989, and subsequently produced several models of home organs. The models included a lifetime free lesson program. They sold these throughout the 1990s, exclusively through their chain of retail stores. Fletcher Music Centers and the Estey Organ Company corporate office is in Clearwater, Florida. In 2019 the brand was revived for a series of entry level instruments manufactured in China for sale through the dealer network left without new product after the demise of Lowrey.

Estey Organ Company Factory

The Estey Organ Company's main factory was located southwest of downtown Brattleboro, on the south side of Whetstone Brook between Birge and Organ Streets.  At its height, the complex had more than 20 buildings, many of which were interconnected by raised walkways and covered bridges.  Several of the buildings were built with distinctive slate siding, resulting in an architecturally unique collection of such structures in the state.  One of the buildings now houses the Estey Organ Museum; the entire surviving complex was listed on the National Register of Historic Places in 1980, both for its architecture, and as a major economic force in Brattleboro for many years.

Social contributions by Estey family

The Estey family had a long tradition of company leadership and community involvement, including residential development such as Esteyville; banking; town government; schools; fire protection; military units; churches; and Vermont state politics and government. Estey Hall on the campus of Shaw University is named after Estey, who contributed to the construction of the building. It was the first building in the entire U.S. dedicated for the higher education of African-American women.  Fletcher Music Centers continued the tradition of community involvement by helping fund a music therapy wing at All Children's Hospital located in St. Petersburg, Florida.

See also
Edwin S. Votey
National Register of Historic Places listings in Windham County, Vermont
List of New York City Designated Landmarks in the Bronx - Estey Piano Company Factory

References

Types of pump organs

Further reading

External links

The Estey Organ Virtual Museum
Estey Organ Museum
Ned Phoenix, Museum Founder NAMM Oral History Interview

Pump organ manufacturers
Musical instrument manufacturing companies of the United States
Defunct manufacturing companies based in Vermont
Buildings and structures in Brattleboro, Vermont
Industrial buildings and structures on the National Register of Historic Places in Vermont
National Register of Historic Places in Windham County, Vermont